Florian Koschat (born September 21, 1974 in Carinthia, Austria) is an Austrian entrepreneur and investment banker.

Early life 
Koschat grew up Hörzendorf (Carinthia) in Austria. In his school days he became aware of the advantages of being wealthy. He studied Business Administration at the Vienna University of Economics and Business and graduated with a doctorate in 2000.

Career 
Prior to 2007, Koschat was Vice President of the Anglo Irish Bank, responsible for Russia and the regional intergovernmental organization CIS. In 2007, Koschat also founded his own company Pallas Capital.

Koschat was appointed to the Supervisory Board of CA Immo in May 2016 for the core shareholder O1. After the sale of the O1 shares to Immofinanz a power struggle arose around the largest real estate companies in Austria. This fight was triggered by a takeover bid by the Starwood Capital Group, which was threaded by Koschat and two other members of the board. Since May 2021, he has no longer been part of the CA Immo Supervisory Board.

As CEO of Pallas Capital Advisory AG, Koschat mediates investors for medium-sized companies and also invests in the German real estate market. Koschat is also known for his performances in social media. For this he is partly criticized or is described as the "Austrian" Dan Bilzerian. He speaks Russian fluently. He also acts as a mentor.

Books 

 Betriebsgeheimnisse. Edition Roesner, Vienna October 2019,

References 

1974 births
Living people
Businesspeople from Vienna